Unhook the Stars is a 1996 American drama film directed by Nick Cassavetes, and starring his mother Gena Rowlands, Marisa Tomei, Gérard Depardieu, and Jake Lloyd in his film debut.

Rowlands plays Mildred, a widow who befriends the wayward Monica (Tomei), a single mother from across the street, and eventually finds herself babysitter of Monica's young son, J.J. (Lloyd) Throughout the film, Monica and J.J. inadvertently teach Mildred valuable life lessons about herself and her relationships with others.

Rowlands and Tomei both received SAG Award nominations for their performances. The film's title refers to a song of the same name by Cyndi Lauper, which can be heard over the closing credits.

Plot
Mildred is a widow living with her rebellious, irresponsible twentysomething daughter Annie in Salt Lake City. One day after a fight, Annie goes to live as a vagrant with her boyfriend, leaving Mildred alone for the first time in her life. Her wayward neighbor Monica knocks on Mildred's door, begging her to watch her young son J.J. so she can go to her work shift. Monica has kicked her abusive husband Frankie out of their house.

Mildred agrees to watch J.J., and offers to babysit and take him to school whenever Monica needs her to. Establishing a close relationship with J.J. and Monica, he eventually comes to refer to her as "Auntie Mildred." Mildred reads to him, takes him to the park, and educates him on history by reading from her encyclopedias. At Thanksgiving, Mildred invites Monica and J.J. over for dinner as well as her yuppie son Ethan and his wife Jeannie. Jeannie is perturbed by Monica's brash behavior and cursing, though Ethan and Mildred seem disaffected by her personality. Ethan suggests that Mildred should move to San Francisco with him and Jeannie.

Mildred spends Christmas with Monica and J.J., and babysits him on New Year's Eve. On Valentine's Day, Frankie comes to Monica's in the middle of the night, begging to reunite with her. She quietly listens to his pleas, but does not open the door. Monica gets a babysitter for J.J. so she can go out for a night with Mildred, taking her to a local pub where she introduces her to her friend Big Tommy, a truck driver who expresses interest in Mildred. Monica leaves the bar without telling Mildred, so Big Tommy gives Mildred a ride home.

Mildred goes to visit Ethan and Jeannie in San Francisco, where he invites her to live on the top floor of their luxurious house overlooking the Bay Area, and reveals that Jeannie is pregnant. She ultimately refuses Ethan's offer, enraging him. Mildred returns home to find that Monica and Frankie have reconciled, and J.J. begins spending more time with his father, leaving Mildred depressed and alone.

One night, Mildred returns home to find Annie there. She asks if she could return home, saying that she now has a job and is applying to college. However, Mildred tells her that she has sold the house, and has to be out by the end of the month. Mildred goes on a date with Tommy, and confesses she doesn't know where she's moving to.

While Monica helps Mildred pack her house, she tells her how much Frankie has improved as a husband, but senses Mildred's distance. Frankie brings J.J. over, and he asks to talk to Mildred in private. J.J. gives her a drawing and thanks her for taking care of him, and the three say their goodbyes. Annie drives Mildred to the airport, though Mildred refuses to tell her where she's going, saying it's a secret.

Cast

Release
The film was released theatrically in the United States on November 1, 1996 in a limited release in New York City. The film grossed a total of $272,542USD playing on three screens. The film late receive a wider release on Valentine's Day 1997.

Critical reception
Unhook the Stars received generally positive critical reaction.  Roger Ebert gave the film three out of four stars, calling it "a film of gentleness and low-key romance," and praised Rowlands' performance. Entertainment Weekly gave the film a B− rating, also praising the film's performances.

The New York Times also praised the performances in the film, but gave an ambivalent review, stating: "The impressive acting can cover up only so many glaring holes in a film that doesn't really know what it wants to say. Unhook the Stars isn't a story that had to be told but a sentimental contrivance constructed around its star."

References

External links
 

1996 films
French romantic drama films
English-language French films
Films directed by Nick Cassavetes
1996 romantic drama films
American romantic drama films
Films shot in Salt Lake City
Miramax films
1996 directorial debut films
1990s English-language films
1990s American films
1990s French films